Road to Alcatraz is a 1945 American mystery film directed by Nick Grinde and written by Dwight V. Babcock and Jerry Sackheim. The film stars Robert Lowery, June Storey, Grant Withers, Clarence Kolb, Charles Gordon and William Forrest. The film was released on July 10, 1945, by Republic Pictures.

Plot

John Norton, a young lawyer, receives a telegram from an old fraternity brother, Gary Payne, which says that an old investment has now turned profitable.  Norton's wife Kit doesn't trust Payne, but they retire for the evening after a short discussion.  The next morning, Norton has a bump on his head, and mysterious evidence that something is amiss.  Showing signs of amnesia, Norton heads to Charles Cantrell's (his law partner) house, only to find evidence that he (Norton) had murdered Cantrell.  Police detective Inspector Craven suspects there is more to the events than just Norton's memory loss.  Eventually Norton confronts Payne, gets shot, and the police arrive in time to save Norton and arrest Payne.

Cast  
Robert Lowery as John Norton
June Storey as Kit Norton
Grant Withers as Inspector Craven
Clarence Kolb as Philip Angreet
Charles Gordon as Gary Payne
William Forrest as Charles Cantrell
Iris Adrian as Louise Rogers
Lillian Bronson as Dorothy Stone
Harry Depp as House Manager
Kenne Duncan as Servant

References

External links 
 
 

1945 films
1940s English-language films
American mystery films
1945 mystery films
Republic Pictures films
Films directed by Nick Grinde
American black-and-white films
1940s American films